Harenaichthys is an extinct genus of osteoglossiform fish that lived in Mongolia during the Late Cretaceous and was found in the Nemegt Formation. The type species is H. lui and is based solely on the holotype, which consists of partial skull parts, isolated and articulated centra, and an articulated caudal fin preserved together within a single sandstone block. The monospecific assemblages of Harenaichthys were affected by the high altitude of their habitat and the fossils show signs of pathologies caused by diseases while the animals were still alive.

Kim et al. (2022) compared a fish centrum found with the holotype of the theropod dinosaur Raptorex kriegsteini with Harenaichthys lui and Xixiaichthys tongxinensis, and interpreted their findings as supporting the conclusion that the holotype of R. kriegsteini comes from the Nemegt Formation. They also tentatively assigned the centrum to Harenaichthys.

References 

 
Nemegt fauna
Fossil taxa described in 2022
Prehistoric ray-finned fish genera